The Stade de la Rabine is a multi-purpose stadium in Vannes, France. It is currently used by Vannes OC and Rugby Club Vannes. The stadium is able to hold 11,303 spectators.

The stadium was used as a venue for the 2013 IRB Junior World Championship, which was won by England. It also hosted the opening match, semifinals, third-place match, and final of the 2018 FIFA U-20 Women's World Cup. On February 3, 2019, it hosted a Six Nations Under 20s Championship match between France and Wales, with France winning 32–10.

References

External links
Venue information

Rabine
Rabine
Vannes OC
Sports venues in Morbihan
Sport in Vannes
Sports venues completed in 2001
21st-century architecture in France